The twelfth series of British reality television series The Apprentice (UK) was broadcast in the UK on BBC One, from 6 October to 18 December 2016; due to live coverage of the UK EU membership referendum in late Spring of that year, alongside live coverage of Euro 2016 and the 2016 Rio Olympics during Summer, the BBC postponed the series' broadcast until the middle of Autumn to avoid clashing with these major events.

It is the first series to date to have episodes aired on Thursdays, before Series 16, rather than on Wednesdays as is traditionally arranged for the programme's broadcast schedule, and the only one to feature a candidate quitting the programme while a task is currently in progress. Alongside the standard twelve episodes, the series was preceded by the mini online episode "Meet the Candidates" on 27 September, with two specials aired alongside the series – "The Final Five" on 13 December, and "Why I Fired Them" on 16 December.

Eighteen candidates took part in the twelfth series, with Alana Spencer becoming the overall winner. Excluding the specials, the series averaged around 7.12 million viewers during its broadcast.

Series Overview 
Towards the conclusion of the eleventh series' broadcast, applications for the twelfth series were made available in December 2015, with production staff assessing applicants between January and February 2016. Work on filming the series took place from late Spring to early Summer, once assessments had determined which eighteen applicants would form the final line-up. Both the filming and broadcast schedule for this series had to take into account three major events receiving live TV coverage during 2016 – the UK government had announced in 2015 that they would be holding a major referendum pertaining to the future of the country's EU membership, which the major broadcasters would be covering, while the BBC's Summer schedule had been prepared to oversee live coverage of both Euro 2016 and the 2016 Rio Olympics. As such it stuck to the same arrangement as had been used in the previous series, though unusually the episodes were arranged so that the majority took place on Thursdays within the standard timeslot it occupied; it is the only series to date to have this arrangement in its broadcast schedule.

Filming on the first task saw the men name their team Titans, while the women named their team Nebula. The series is notable for being the second time that both teams lost a task, though with six candidates being brought to face an in-depth review of their performance, the highest number to ever be brought back to the boardroom on any incarnation of The Apprentice brand. It is also the first time in the show's history that a candidate quit the programme while a task was currently underway, while the result of the Interviews stage drew notable criticism over gender discrimination in the aftermath of the episode that some members of the programme, particularly Karen Brady, disputed. Of those who took part, Alana Spencer would become the eventual winner, going on to use her prize to start up a nationwide bakery business she would name Ridiculously Rich.

Candidates

Performance chart 

Key:
 The candidate won this series of The Apprentice.
 The candidate was the runner-up.
 The candidate won as project manager on his/her team, for this task.
 The candidate lost as project manager on his/her team, for this task.
 The candidate was on the winning team for this task / they passed the Interviews stage.
 The candidate was on the losing team for this task.
 The candidate was brought to the final boardroom for this task.
 The candidate was fired in this task.
 The candidate lost as project manager for this task and was fired.
 The candidate left the competition on this task.

Episodes

Ratings 
Official episode viewing figures are from BARB.

References

External links 
 Official site BBC

12
2016 British television seasons